Yavuz Özkan (1942 – 21 May 2019) was a Turkish film director and screenwriter. Özkan is best known for his 1978 film The Mine.

Selected filmography
 "İlkbahar - Sonbahar " (2011) 
 Hayal Kurma Oyunları (1999)
 Bir Erkeğin Anatomisi (1997)
 Bir Kadının Anatomisi (1995)
 Yengeç Sepeti (1994)
 Bir Sonbahar Hikayesi 1994
 İki Kadın (1992)
 Ateş Üstünde Yürümek (1991)
 Büyük Yalnızlık (1990)
 Filim Bitti (1989)
 Umut Yarına Kaldı (1988)
 Yağmur Kaçakları (1987)
 Son Savaşçı (1985)
 Sevgiliye Mektuplar (1982)
 Demiryol (1979)
 The Mine 1978
 Vardiya (1976)
 Yarış (1975)
 2x2=5 (1974)

References

External links
 

1942 births
2019 deaths
People from Yozgat
Turkish film directors
Burials at Zincirlikuyu Cemetery